Dahl or Dahle is a surname of Germanic origin. Dahl, which means valley in the North Germanic languages (tal in German, dale in northern England English), is common in Germany, Norway, Denmark, Sweden and the Faroe Islands. The origin of the German forms Dahl and Dahle may have been in medieval Westphalia. In Germany about 11 places are called Dahl. In the Netherlands, a suburb of the city of Nijmegen (which in turn is named after an old estate in the area) is called "Heyerdaal" (also spelled as "Heijerdaal"), in which "daal" also means "valley". Other examples are "Bloemendaal," "Rozendaal," and "Roosendaal."
There are several variations as it was common to add a suffix to Dahl in order to denote the name bearer's original locale or occupation. You also find several variations of -dahl used with prefixes (Heyerdahl, Heimendahl...).

Dahl

Arts and media
 Arlene Dahl (1925–2021), American film actress
 Arne Dahl, pen name of Swedish crime writer Jan Arnald
 Arnim Dahl (1922–1998), German Stuntman
 Carina Dahl (born 1962), Swedish writer and film director
 Carina Dahl (born 1985), Norwegian pop singer and songwriter
 Cecilie Dahl (1858–1943), Norwegian painter
 Cecilie Dahl (born 1960), Norwegian artist
 Elena Dahl (born 1947), Russian-Swedish author and translator
Felicity Dahl (born 1938), British film producer; wife of Roald Dahl
 Hans Dahl (1849–1937), Norwegian painter
 Hjalmar Dahl (1891–1960), Finnish translator and writer
 Ingolf Dahl (1912–1970), German-born American composer of Swedish ancestry
 Johann Christian Dahl (1788–1857), Norwegian artist
 John Dahl (born 1956), American filmmaker
 Kjell Ola Dahl (born 1958), Norwegian writer writing as K. O. Dahl
 Karen Dahl (born 1955), Canadian artist
 Laura Dahl (born 1974),  American fashion designer
 Louise Dahl-Wolfe (1895–1989), Norwegian-American fashion and portrait photographer
 Michael Dahl (1659–1743), Swedish painter
 Oleg Dahl (1941–1981), Russian actor
 Roald Dahl (1916–1990), British novelist
 Sophie Dahl (born 1977), British model and writer; granddaughter of Roald Dahl
 Stephan Dahl (born 1971), British writer and a lecturer
 Steve Dahl (born 1954), American radio personality
 Tessa Dahl (born 1957), British writer; daughter of Roald Dahl
 Viking Dahl (1895–1945), Swedish composer

Education and academia
 Christopher Dahl (administrator) (born 1946), American college president from New York
 Darren Dahl, Canadian business economist
 Olga Dahl (1917–2009), Swedish genealogist
 Robert A. Dahl (1915–2014), American political scientist
 Vladimir Dahl (1801–1872), Russian lexicographer

Military
 Arne Dagfin Dahl (1894–1990), Norwegian general and commander of the Independent Norwegian Brigade Group in Germany
 Larry G. Dahl (1949–1971), US Army veteran and Medal of Honor recipient

Politics
 Donald Dahl (1945–2014), American politician
 Gregory L. Dahl (born 1952), American politician and lawyer
 Harold J. Dahl (1930–1989), American politician and judge
 Kristian Thulesen Dahl (born 1969), head of the largest party of the incumbent ruling bloc of Denmark
 Niels Lauritz Dahl (1925–2014), Norwegian diplomat
 Olaf H. Dahl (1870-1942), American businessman and politician

Religion
 Jákup Dahl (1878–1944), Faroese provost and Bible translator
 Laila Riksaasen Dahl (born 1947), Norwegian Lutheran bishop
 K. G. William Dahl (1883–1917), Swedish-American Lutheran pastor, author and social advocate

Science
 Anders Dahl (1751–1789), Swedish botanist
 Friedrich Dahl (1856–1929), German zoologist
 Knut Dahl (1871–1951), Norwegian ichthyologist
 Lawrence F. Dahl (1929–2021), professor emeritus of chemistry at the University of Wisconsin–Madison
 Nikolai Dahl (1860–1939), Russian physician and Sergei Rachmaninov's psychologist
 Ole-Johan Dahl (1931–2002), Norwegian computer scientist

Sports
 Albin Dahl (1900–1980), Swedish soccer player
 Alexander Dahl (1892–1978) German balloonist and author
 Craig Dahl (born 1985), American ice hockey coach- St. Cloud State University
 David Dahl (baseball) (born 1994), American baseball outfielder
 Harvey Dahl (born 1981), American National Football League player-St. Louis Rams
 Ida-Marie Dahl (born 1998), Danish handball player
 Ingrid Dahl (born 1964), Norwegian chess master
 Jay Dahl (1945–1965), American baseball pitcher
 Jon Dahl Tomasson (born 1976), Danish football (soccer) player
 Viljo Petersson-Dahl (born 1982), Swedish wheelchair curler

Dahle

Arts and music
Gro Dahle (born 1962), Norwegian poet and writer
Kurt Dahle (contemporary), Canadian rock drummer
Ryan Dahle (born 1970), Canadian rock musician

Politics
Herman Dahle (1855–1920), American politician from Wisconsin; U.S. congressman
Kevin Dahle (born 1960), American politician from Minnesota; state legislator
Torstein Dahle (born 1947), Norwegian politician and economist

Sports
Mona Dahle (born 1970), Norwegian Olympic handball player

Other
Johann Dahle (1749-1847), Hessian soldier and pioneering Virginian
Øystein Dahle (born 1938), Norwegian businessman and organizational leader

See also
Dahlin (surname)
Dahlen (surname)
Dale, surname that had a similar spelling

References

Danish-language surnames
Norwegian-language surnames
Swedish-language surnames